Tambar is an offshore oil field located in the southern Norwegian section of North Sea along with Ula and Gyda fields making up the UGT area, usually attributed to DONG Energy's main areas of exploration and production activity.  The Ula field was discovered in 1983 and came online in 2001. Tambar was discovered in 1983 and became operational in July 2001. It contains confirmed 46.9 million m3 of oil.

Ownership
Aker BP is the operator of the field with 55% of interest in the project. DNO holds 45% of interest.

Production
Tambar has 4 production wells and 6 slots. The field has one unmanned wellhead facility without the processing equipment. However, the facility does have conditions to accommodate 12 people. Gas injection is used at Tambar and the produced oil is pumped to Ula facilities via Tambar-Ula pipeline which came online in 2007 and is then transported by a pipeline to Ekofisk oil field and on to Teesside for refining. The gas produced at Tambar field is injected into Ula field to increase oil production. The field is expected to produce until 2021.

Tambar WHP Platform
Tambar WHP Platform was designed by Aker Solutions Engineering in 2000-2001.

Tambar Øst
Tambar Øst (East) is located just a few kilometers away from Tambar. It has been developed with a production well from Tambar's main facility. Production started on October 2, 2007. The produced oil is pumped to Tambar and then onto Ula field.

Ownership
Tambar Øst is also operated by BP. BP holds 46.2%, while DONG Energyholds 43.24%, Talisman Energy - 9.76%, Norske AEDC AS (NAEDC) - 0.8%.

See also

Ula oil field
Gyda oil field
Oselvar oil field
Ekofisk oil field
Norpipe
North Sea oil
Economy of Norway

References

External links
BP official website
Image of the Tambar's unmanned remotely controlled facility from Offshore Magazine

BP oil and gas fields
Former Ørsted (company) oil and gas fields
North Sea oil fields
Oil fields in Norway